Brusveen is a Norwegian surname. Notable people with the surname include:

Håkon Brusveen (1927–2021), Norwegian cross-country skier
Kjelfrid Brusveen (1926–2009), Norwegian cross country skier

Norwegian-language surnames